Peter John Cartwright  (3 May 1940 – 17 April 2019) was a New Zealand lawyer and, as the husband of Dame Silvia Cartwright, viceregal consort of New Zealand between 2001 and 2006.

Early life and career
Born in Dunedin on 3 May 1940, Cartwright was the son of James Patrick Cartwright and Gladys Josephine Cartwright (née Laffey). He was educated as a boarder at St Bede's College in Christchurch, and then studied law at the University of Otago from 1960 to 1965, graduating with a Bachelor of Laws. He went on to become a partner in a law firm in Hamilton as a commercial lawyer.

Cartwright served on the boards of IHC New Zealand and the Donald Beasley Institute, and was chair of the latter for several years. He also chaired the Medical Practitioners Disciplinary Tribunal, the Indecent Publications Tribunal and the Broadcasting Standards Authority, was a member of the Accident Compensation Appeal Authority, and patron of Citizen Advocacy Auckland.

Personal life
In 1969, Cartwright married Silvia Rose Poulter who, as Silvia Cartwright, became the first female High Court judge in New Zealand, and who was appointed as the 18th Governor-General of New Zealand in 2001, serving until 2006.

Cartwright died in Auckland on 17 April 2019.

Honours
In 2001, Cartwright was appointed a Commander of the Order of St John. In the 2006 Queen's Birthday Honours, he was appointed a Companion of the New Zealand Order of Merit, for public services and services to the community, and later that year, at the conclusion of his wife's term as governor-general, he was made a Companion of the Queen's Service Order for community service.

References

1940 births
2019 deaths
Commanders of the Order of St John
Companions of the New Zealand Order of Merit
Companions of the Queen's Service Order
Lawyers from Dunedin
People educated at St Bede's College, Christchurch
Spouses of New Zealand Governors-General
University of Otago alumni